Steven McRae (born 19 December 1985) is an Australian ballet dancer and tap dancer. He is a principal dancer with the Royal Ballet, London.

Early life
Steven McRae was raised in the Sydney suburb of Plumpton the son of a drag racer.
He started dancing at age seven, after watching his older sister in her dance classes. He studied tap as well as ballet. He was soon being entered for the performing-arts competitions in Australia known as eisteddfods, often gracing 25 sections at a time. By his teens, already an extremely capable tapper, Steven McRae knew that his future lay in dance, and trained throughout high school.

In 2002, at age 16, he won the gold medal at the 2002 Genée held in Sydney that year. In 2003, at age 17, he won the Prix de Lausanne in Switzerland, earning a scholarship, and entered the Royal Ballet School in London.

Career
He graduated into The Royal Ballet in 2004 and was promoted to first artist in 2005, soloist in 2006, first soloist in 2008 and principal in 2009. The Guardian has called McRae "a modern-day Fred Astaire". In 2014, he was named "Young Australian Achiever of the Year in the UK" for his work with the Royal Ballet.

First principal role
In 2005, in his first season with the Royal Ballet, McRae jumped on the occasion to dance Symphonic Variations by Frederick Ashton, which is an iconic piece of the Royal Ballet. Symphonic Variations was Ashton's first work after World War II, and one of the Company's first to be performed on the huge main stage of the Royal Opera House.

On stage
In 2011, McRae originated the role of the Mad Hatter in Christopher Wheeldon's Alice's Adventures in Wonderland at the Royal Opera House. In 2014, he originated the role of Prince Florizel in Christopher Wheeldon's new full-length ballet The Winter's Tale.

In 2016, McRae originated the role of "The Creature" in Liam Scarlett's full-length ballet of Mary Shelley's Frankenstein.

"There is a moment before Steven McRae steps on stage that you easily can mistake for nerves and he has learnt over the years that it's not nerves, it's adrenaline and a slight sense of anxiety. It's almost impossible to dance as a soloist without this performance element."

He is frequently used in works from Royal Ballet choreographer Wayne McGregor such as Chroma, Multiverse, and Limen as he is very quick in picking up on McGregor's modern style as well as the way he can manipulate his body.

Injuries
In January 2008, at 22, McRae partially tore his Achilles tendon and was told that not only would he never dance again but he would have an enduring limp. He found "a most incredible" Swedish surgeon and it took a year, until December 2008, to recover.

He started rehabilitation classes with his coach, Lesley Collier, and psychological rehabilitation, and studied for a BA Hons in business management and leadership. McRae completed his university degree whilst working full time.

He works still with Lesley Collier, a principal dancer with the Royal Ballet from 1972 to 1995 and répétiteur since 2000, as his coach at the Royal Ballet.

During a live performance in October 2019, McRae again tore his Achiles tendon; he returned to performing in October 2021.

Film work
McRae plays Skimbleshanks the railway cat in Cats. He is featured in the BBC show Men at the Barre.

Style
McRae's most marked characteristics are his speed and his red hair.

Personal life
McRae is married to Elizabeth Harrod, soloist with the Royal Ballet, and they have one daughter, Audrey Bluebell, born in December 2014, and two sons, Frederick Charles, born in November 2016 and Rupert George, born in August 2019.

Repertory

 Alice's Adventures in Wonderland : Magician/Mad Hatter
 Sweet Violets : Jack
 Hansel and Gretel : Sandman
 Frankenstein : Creature
 Swan Lake : Siegfried
 Giselle : Albrecht
 Romeo and Juliet : Romeo
 Manon : Des Grieux
 The Sleeping Beauty : Prince Florimund 
 Mayerling : Crown Prince Rudolf
 The Nutcracker : Sugar Plum Fairy's Cavalier

Awards
 2002 : Genée International Ballet Competition, Gold Medal
 2003 : Prix de Lausanne
 2007 : Emerging Male Artist (Classical)
 2012 : Best Male Dancer Awards at the Critics’ Circle Dance Awards
 2014 : Young Australian Achiever in the UK by the Australia Day Foundation

References

External links

 Steven McRae, website of The Royal Opera House
 Steven McRae performs Czárdás during World Ballet Day 2015, website of The Royal Ballet
 Interview: Steven McRae, by Lyndsey Winship, Time Out, 25 February 2011
 With Ballet I'm like a superhero and each jump is a power move, by Lindsey Winship, London Evening Standard, 25 February 2016

Principal dancers of The Royal Ballet
Australian male ballet dancers
Australian male dancers
People educated at the Royal Ballet School
People from Sydney
Australian expatriates in England
Living people
1985 births
Tap dancers